Wolfram Fiedler (29 September 1951 – 11 April 1988) was an East German luger who competed from the mid-1960s to the mid-1970s. He won two bronze medals at the 1972 Winter Olympics in Sapporo, earning them in the men's singles and men's doubles event, respectively.

Fiedler also won two medals in the men's singles event at the FIL World Luge Championships with a gold in 1975 and a silver in 1973.

He also won three medals in the men's singles event at the FIL European Luge Championships with two golds (1972, 1976) and one silver (1975).

Fiedler died of cancer in 1988. The summer luge track in his hometown of Ilmenau was named in his honor the following year.

References

Ilmenau information on Fiedler, shown as W. Fiedler 
List of European luge champions 

1951 births
1988 deaths
People from Ilmenau
German male lugers
Sportspeople from Thuringia
Olympic lugers of East Germany
Lugers at the 1972 Winter Olympics
Olympic bronze medalists for East Germany
Olympic medalists in luge
Medalists at the 1972 Winter Olympics
Recipients of the Patriotic Order of Merit in bronze
Deaths from cancer in East Germany